These were the individual stages of the 2010 Vuelta a España, with Stage 12 on 9 September to Stage 21 on 19 September.

Stages
 s.t. indicates that the rider crossed the finish line in the same group as the one receiving the time above him, and was therefore credited with the same finishing time.

Stage 12
9 September 2010 — Andorra la Vella (Andorra) to Lleida,

Stage 13
10 September 2010 — Rincón de Soto to Burgos,

Stage 14
11 September 2010 — Burgos to Peña Cabarga,

Stage 15
12 September 2010 — Solares to Lagos de Covadonga,

Stage 16
13 September 2010 — Gijón to Alto de Cotobello,

Stage 17
15 September 2010 — Peñafiel (ITT),

Stage 18
16 September 2010 — Valladolid to Salamanca,

Stage 19
17 September 2010 — Piedrahíta to Toledo,

Stage 20
18 September 2010 — San Martín de Valdeiglesias to Bola del Mundo,

Stage 21
19 September 2010 — San Sebastián de los Reyes to Madrid,

References

, Stage 12 To Stage 21, 2010 Vuelta A Espana
Vuelta a España stages